Daryl Clark (born 10 February 1993) is an English professional rugby league footballer who plays as a  for the Warrington Wolves in the Betfred Super League and England at international level. 

He played for the Castleford Tigers (Heritage № 915) in the Super League between 2011 and 2014.

Background
Clark was born in Castleford, Yorkshire, England. He is of Scottish descent.

He attended Airedale High School and played amateur rugby for Fryston Warriors.

Playing career
He started his professional career with hometown club Castleford, making his début in February 2011. He made 21 appearances in his first season at the club, and was rewarded with a five-year contract. 

He played in the 2014 Challenge Cup Final defeat by the Leeds Rhinos at Wembley Stadium.

In August 2014, it was confirmed that Clark had been signed by Warrington for a fee of £185,000. In his final season with the club, he won the 2014 Steve Prescott Man of Steel award. 

He played in the 2016 Challenge Cup Final defeat by Hull F.C. at Wembley Stadium.

He played in the 2016 Super League Grand Final defeat by the Wigan Warriors at Old Trafford.

He played in the 2018 Challenge Cup Final defeat by the Catalans Dragons at Wembley Stadium.

He played in the 2018 Super League Grand Final defeat by the Wigan Warriors at Old Trafford.

He played in the 2019 Challenge Cup Final victory over St. Helens at Wembley Stadium. He scored Warrington's third and final try and was voted Lance Todd Trophy becoming only the third  to win the trophy

International career
In 2011, Clark was named in the Scotland squad, but did not make an appearance. After playing one match for England Knights in 2012, Clark confirmed he would no longer be putting himself forward to play for Scotland, as he would prefer to play for England.

He then made his début for England in the 2014 Four Nations tournament in Australia.

In October 2016, Clark was selected in England's 2016 Four Nations squad. Before the tournament, England played a test match against France in which saw Clark score his first ever test try in England's 40–6 win.

He was selected in England 9s squad for the 2019 Rugby League World Cup 9s.

He was selected in squad for the 2019 Great Britain Lions tour of the Southern Hemisphere.

References

External links
Warrington Wolves profile
SL profile
Profile at castigers.com

1993 births
Living people
Castleford Tigers players
Combined Nationalities rugby league team players
England Knights national rugby league team players
England national rugby league team players
English people of Scottish descent
English rugby league players
Great Britain national rugby league team players
Lance Todd Trophy winners
Rugby league hookers
Rugby league players from Castleford
Warrington Wolves players